Chionodes bastuliella is a moth of the family Gelechiidae. It is found in Spain.

The wingspan is about 14 mm for males and 12 mm for females. The ground colour of the forewings is grey, with black sprinkling. The hindwings are whitish grey.

References

Moths described in 1931
Chionodes
Moths of Europe